Schinia parmeliana is a moth of the family Noctuidae. It is found in North America, including Maryland, Texas, South Carolina and Oklahoma.

The wingspan is about 20 mm.

External links
Images
Butterflies and Moths of North America
Species report

Schinia
Moths of North America
Moths described in 1882